James Griffiths & Sons, Inc. was founded by Captain James Griffiths (1861-1943) in Seattle, Washington in 1885.  James Griffiths was from Newport, England, where he was a captain of a ship. He started as an agent for NYK Line of Japan. James Griffiths ran the company with his sons: Stanley and Bert. James Griffiths & Sons, Inc. entered into a venture with the Olympic Steamship Company in 1936 to form the Consolidated Olympic Company. Consolidated Olympic Company had routes to Long Beach, California,  Seattle and Tacoma, Washington, called the Olympic-Griffiths Line. The Olympic-Griffiths Line ship was the SS Olympic Pioneer was a 7,216-ton cargo ships, common freight was lumber and newsprint. Other ships operated were leased.

James Griffiths shipyard
In 1916 James Griffiths purchased the Puget Sound shipyard, Winslow Marine Railway and Shipbuilding Company on Bainbridge Island, Washington. 
During World War II, the shipyard built minesweepers: s and s. In 1948 Griffiths the sold the shipyard.

World War II
James Griffiths & Sons, Inc. fleet of ships were used to help the World War II effort. During World War II James Griffiths & Sons, Inc. operated Merchant navy ships for the United States Shipping Board. During World War II James Griffiths & Sons, Inc. was active with charter shipping with the Maritime Commission and War Shipping Administration. James Griffiths & Sons, Inc. operated Liberty ships and Victory ships for the merchant navy. The ship was run by its James Griffiths & Sons, Inc. crew and the US Navy supplied United States Navy Armed Guards to man the deck guns and radio.

Ships

James Griffiths & Sons, Inc. ships
Olympic Pioneer, was Liberty ship James A. Drain, acquired in 1947, sold in 1962  
Griffson, Cargo, 2,259 tons built in 1916, built by Winslow Marine Railway & Shipbuilding Company in Winslow
Anyox, Cargo, 1,287 tons built in 1917, built by Winslow Marine Railway & Shipbuilding Company in Winslow 
Sueja III, Yacht, 179 tons, built in 1926, built by Winslow Marine Railway & Shipbuilding Company in Winslow, renamed Salvage Queen in 1941, renamed Sheng-Li in 1946, burnt Whangpoo River in 1948

Liberty ships operated
 Edmond Mallett 
 Edward A. MacDowell 
 Nicholas J. Sinnott 
 Rufus W. Peckham 
 William Cullen Bryant

Victory ships operated
 Douglas Victory

Ships built by Captain James Griffiths
Ships built by Captain James Griffiths 1919 to 1947:

See also

World War II United States Merchant Navy

References 

Defunct shipping companies of the United States
American companies established in 1885